Camila Osorio was the defending champion, having won the previous edition in 2019, but was no longer eligible to participate in junior events. She participated in the women's singles event, but lost to Ons Jabeur in the second round.

Robin Montgomery won the title, defeating Kristina Dmitruk in the final, 6–2, 6–4.

Seeds 
All seeds received a bye into the second round.

Draw

Finals

Top half

Section 1

Section 2

Bottom half

Section 3

Section 4

Qualifying

Seeds

Qualifiers

Lucky loser

Draw

First qualifier

Second qualifier

Third qualifier

Fourth qualifier

Fifth qualifier

Sixth qualifier

References

External links 
 Draw

Girls' Singles
2021